The Hunter 456 is an American sailboat that was designed by the Hunter Design Team as a cruiser and first built in 2003.

Production
The design was built by Hunter Marine in the United States, but it is now out of production.

Design
The Hunter 456 is a recreational keelboat, built predominantly of fiberglass. It has a masthead sloop B&R rig, a raked stem, a walk-through reverse transom with a swimming platform and folding ladder, a center cockpit, an internally mounted spade-type rudder controlled by a wheel and a fixed fin keel or optional wing keel. With the fin keel it displaces  and carries  of lead ballast. With the wing keel it displaces  and carries  of lead ballast.

Factory standard equipment included a 110% roller furling genoa, three two-speed self-tailing winches (one for rigging and two for the jib sheets), an electric self-tailing halyard winch, anodized spars, marine VHF radio, knotmeter, depth sounder, AM/FM radio and CD player with eight speakers, dual offset anchor rollers, hot and cold water transom shower, integral solar panel, sealed teak and holly cabin sole, two fully enclosed heads with showers, aft head bathtub, private forward and aft cabins, a dinette table that converts to a berth, complete set of kitchen dishes for six people and bedding, microwave oven, dual sinks, three-burner gimbaled liquid petroleum gas stove and oven, a fog bell and six life jackets. Factory options included in-mast mainsail furling, an asymmetrical spinnaker and rigging, a double aft cabin, air conditioning, clothing washer and drier, GPS and a Bimini top.

See also
List of sailing boat types

Similar sailboats
C&C 45
Hunter 45
Hunter 45 DS
Hunter 460
Hunter 466
Hunter Passage 450

References

External links
Official brochure

Keelboats
2000s sailboat type designs
Sailing yachts
Sailboat type designs by Hunter Design Team
Sailboat types built by Hunter Marine